Carenum puncticolle is a species of ground beetle in the subfamily Scaritinae, found in Australia. It was described by William John Macleay in 1864.

References

puncticolle
Beetles described in 1864